Samantha Poolman (born 4 March 1991), also known as Sam Poolman, is a former Australian netball player. Between 2010 and 2015, Poolman played for NNSW Blues, NNSW Waratahs and Southern Force in the Australian Netball League. Between 2013 and 2016, she played for Adelaide Thunderbirds in the ANZ Championship. She was a member of the Thunderbirds team that won the 2013 ANZ Championship. Between 2017 and 2021, Poolman has played for Giants in Suncorp Super Netball.

Early life, family and education
Poolman is originally from Newcastle, New South Wales. She was born in John Hunter Hospital. She is the daughter of John and Robyn Poolman and she has three brothers.  She attended Lambton High School. In 2021 Poolman was named Newcastle's Young Citizen of the Year.

Playing career

Early years
Poolman began playing netball aged seven, playing for the West Leagues Netball Club in Newcastle. As a 16-year-old, she was invited to training sessions with Hunter Jaegers. She was also selected for the Newcastle representative team and gained scholarships to the Hunter Academy of Sport, the New South Wales Institute of Sport and the Australian Institute of Sport.

New South Wales
Between 2007 and 2012, Poolman represented New South Wales in the Australian National Netball Championships at under-17, under-19 and under-21 levels, playing in five tournament winning teams.

Australian Netball League
Poolman played for Territory Storm, NNSW Blues and NNSW Waratahs in the Australian Netball League. She played for Storm in 2009, for Blues in 2010 and 2011 and for Waratahs in 2012. After signing for Adelaide Thunderbirds, Poolman subsequently played in the ANL for Southern Force diring the 2013, 2014 and 2015 seasons.

Adelaide Thunderbirds
Between 2013 and 2016, Poolman played for Adelaide Thunderbirds in the ANZ Championship. She was a member of the Thunderbirds team that won the 2013 ANZ Championship, playing in Rounds 2, 3, 8 and 10. In 2014 she played in six games, including her starting debut against New South Wales Swifts in Round 3.

Garville
Between 2013 and 2015, while playing for Adelaide Thunderbirds and Southern Force, Poolman also played for Garville in the Netball South Australia Premier League.

Giants Netball
Between 2017 and 2021, Poolman played for Giants Netball in Suncorp Super Netball. In 2017 Poolman was vice captain of the Giants team that finished as runners up in the new league's inaugural season. She subsequently shared the Giants Members' Player of the Year award with Joanne Harten. In 2018 she was a member of the Giants team that finished as minor premiers. Poolman made her 50th senior national league appearance in the 2018 Round 9 match against Adelaide Thunderbirds.  While playing for Giants, Poolman also served as a player delegate for the Australian Netball Players Association. Poolman made her 100th senior national league appearance in a 2021 Round 13 match. She subsequently played for Giants in the 2021 grand final. In September 2021, she announced her retirement as an elite netball player.

Australia
Between 2007 and 2011, Poolman represented Australia at under-17, under-19 and under-21 levels. She also played for Australia at both the 2017 and 2018 Fast5 Netball World Series tournaments. She captained Australia at the latter tournament.

Coach
Since 2017 Poolman has led and coached with the ASPIRE Development Program. The program provides netball coaching for 11 to 17-year-olds based in the Hunter Region.

Personal life
Poolman is in a relationship with Ben Kennedy. They share a home in East Maitland

Honours
Adelaide Thunderbirds
ANZ Championship
Winners: 2013
Giants Netball
Suncorp Super Netball
Runners up: 2017, 2021 
Minor premiers: 2018, 2021 
New South Wales
Australian National Netball Championships
Winners: Under-17 (2007), Under-19 (2008, 2009), Under-21 (2010, 2011)

References

1991 births
Living people
Australian netball players
Australian netball coaches
Australia international Fast5 players
Netball players from New South Wales
Adelaide Thunderbirds players
Giants Netball players
Australian Institute of Sport netball players
Territory Storm players
Netball New South Wales Blues players
Netball New South Wales Waratahs players
Southern Force (netball) players
Garville Netball Club players
ANZ Championship players
Suncorp Super Netball players
Australian Netball League players
South Australia state netball league players
New South Wales Institute of Sport netball players
Sportspeople from Newcastle, New South Wales
New South Wales state netball league players